Zaiter is a surname. Notable people with the surname include:

Ghazi Zaiter (born 1949), Lebanese politician
Sandra Zaiter (born 1943), Puerto Rican actress, television host, singer, composer, and athlete

See also
Zaiser